is a monthly magazine about books published by Kadokawa Corporation, launched in 1994 by Recruit Co. The first publisher was Yoshio Kimura, the editor-in-chief was Yasuhiro Nagazono, and the art director was Toshiaki Ichikawa.

Overview 
Da Vinci is a book information magazine that introduces new publications, popular books and comics. The magazine also features essays by famous people, reader-submitted columns, questionnaires, special features on the relationship between the world and books from a new perspective, and a wide range of information on new paperbacks, new books, and new comics. It also includes information on approaching authors for book signings.
 Although it is a literary magazine, it is subculture-oriented, actively introducing not only general novels but also manga and light novels.
 The covers are mainly modeled after popular young actors, musicians, and celebrities, each holding the book they like best.
 It is the magazine that created the manga essay genre. The magazine selected Haruko Ohtagaki and Saori Oguri, who were not yet on the scene, to create a bestseller, and "Manga Essay Theater" was born from that.
Da Vinci was previously owned by Media Factory. Kadokawa has acquired Media Factory since then.

Da Vinci Literature Award 
The Da Vinci Prize for Literature was a newcomer's literary prize offered by Media Factory's (now KADOKAWA) magazine Da Vinci, accepting novels of 100 to 200 pages in 400-character manuscript paper. Any genre of work was acceptable. The winner received a cash prize of one million yen, and the winning work (or a collection of works including the winning work) was published by Media Factory (now KADOKAWA) .

Other than the Grand Prize, the cash prizes were 200,000 yen for the Excellence Award and Reader's Award, and 100,000 yen for the Editor-in-Chief's Special Award.

The contest ended with the 7th edition in 2012, and the Da Vinci "Story of Books" Grand Prize was established as the successor prize, limiting the content to "stories related to books.

Da Vinci "Book Story" Grand Prize 
The Da Vinci "Book Story" Grand Prize (Da Vinci Real Story)  is the successor to the Da Vinci Literature Award, which ended with the 7th edition in 2012. It launched in 2013, The prize is limited to "stories related to books," and invites entries of 250 to 350 pages of 400-character manuscript paper. The winner will receive a cash prize of one million yen, and the winning story will be published by Media Factory (now KADOKAWA).There are also prizes for excellence, readers' prizes, and special prizes. The final selection is made not only by the editorial department, but also by 100 readers' judges and bookstore staff, making it a unique literary award in its selection method.

Da Vinci Book of the Year Award 

The "Da Vinci" Book of the Year is an annual ranking that started in 2001. The ranking is not simply based on sales order, but on the votes of "book connoisseurs" such as book critics, bookstore employees, da Vinci survey members, and reading meter users from all over Japan each year 4000-6000 people participate.

According to Media Factory, the ranking has a high degree of credibility, and its influence is increasing every year, as the grand prize winning titles are labeled as award-winning titles on the book's cover and in stores.

Da Vinci E-book Award 
The Da Vinci Electronic Book Award (Da Vinci Densho Seitaisho) is a media award for electronic books established in 2011 by Media Factory Inc. (now KADOKAWA)

Since 2012, it has been known as the E-Book Award. All e-book titles distributed during the last year are eligible. The grand prize winner will receive a cash prize of one million yen.

The e-book awards are given to e-books and e-comics in all genres except for adult titles distributed in the previous year, and are based on an original bestseller ranking based on annual sales data from 21 e-bookstores. This year's awards are the fourth in the series. This year marks the fourth time it has been held. The aim is to keep e-books boom from declining hence a bestseller award. It stopped after 2014.

Selection method: Original best seller from annual sales data of e-bookstores' aggregate rankings. The readers prize is based on readers' vote.

References

External links 

 Da Vinci News (Official Site)
 "Da Vinci" editorial department (@davinci_editor) --Twitter

1994 establishments in Japan
Literary magazines
Kadokawa Shoten magazines
Magazines established in 1994
Magazines published in Tokyo
Monthly manga magazines published in Japan